Mario Joseph DeMarco, (July 24, 1924 – December 9, 1956) was an American college football, National Football League, and professional Canadian football player, and was one of 62 people who died on Trans-Canada Air Lines Flight 810, on December 9, 1956.

Raised in Boonton, DeMarco started at offensive lineman for four seasons at Boonton High School.

DeMarco played professionally as an offensive lineman for the NFL's Detroit Lions in 1949, before joining the Edmonton Eskimos of the Western Interprovincial Football Union for two seasons beginning in 1951.  DeMarco joined the Saskatchewan Roughriders in 1953, and was a member of the team for four years until the time of his death. He was a three time West All-Star (in 1951, 1952 and 1954).  DeMarco's #55 jersey is one of eight that has been retired by the Roughriders.

College career 
DeMarco played collegiately for the University of Miami Hurricanes from 1945 to 1949.

Professional career 
Following college, DeMarco signed with the NFL Detroit Lions, playing one season in 1949 and one season with the New York Giants.  In 1951, DeMarco joined the WIFU Edmonton Eskimos, where he played for two years.  DeMarco joined the Saskatchewan Roughriders in 1952, and played with them until his death. He was a West All-Star in 1951, 1952 and 1954, and was on his way back to Regina, Saskatchewan, on Flight 810 after watching teammates Mel Becket and Gordon Sturtridge play in the 1956 East–West All-Star game in Vancouver, British Columbia, on December 8, 1956.

Death 
DeMarco, along with Roughriders teammates, Becket, Sturtridge, and Ray Syrnyk, were passengers on Trans-Canada Air Lines Flight 810 with another CFL player, Calvin Jones, of the Winnipeg Blue Bombers. All five players were present at the 1956  East–West All-Star game in Vancouver, British Columbia, and were headed back to their respective teams' home cities.  The five players were accompanied by 54 other passengers, and 3 crew members who all lost their lives in Western Canada's worst aviation disaster on December 9, 1956. The crash is the subject of the 2012 documentary The Crash of Flight 810, part of TSN's Engraved on a Nation series of eight documentaries celebrating the 100th Grey Cup.

Legacy 
Since 1957, in memory of DeMarco and his teammate Mel Becket, the WIFU and its successor, the Canadian Football League, have annually awarded the DeMarco-Becket Memorial Trophy to the most outstanding lineman in the West Division.

References

Sources 
Pro-Football Reference.com Profile – Mario DeMarco
 CFL Facts & Figures.  2009 Edition. All-Time Division All-Star List on page 227.

1924 births
1956 deaths
American football offensive linemen
American players of Canadian football
Boonton High School alumni
Canadian football offensive linemen
Detroit Lions players
Edmonton Elks players
Miami Hurricanes football players
Montreal Alouettes players
Saskatchewan Roughriders players
People from Boonton, New Jersey
Players of American football from New Jersey
Sportspeople from Morris County, New Jersey
American people of Italian descent
Victims of aviation accidents or incidents in Canada
Accidental deaths in British Columbia
Victims of aviation accidents or incidents in 1956